Majoun or majun is a Moroccan confection, which can resemble a pastry ball, fudge, or jam. Ingredients can include honey, nuts, and dried fruits, and the treat is commonly made as a cannabis edible, sometimes in combination with other drugs. 
A 1957 report describes majun as containing "hemp, opium and seeds of datura".

See also
 Bhang
 Boza
 Spiritual use of cannabis
 Thandai

References

Cannabis in Morocco
Arab cuisine
Moroccan cuisine
Cannabis foods